The pyramid slitshell, scientific name Gyrotoma pyramidata, was a species of freshwater snail, a gastropod in the Pleuroceridae family. It was endemic to the United States. It is now extinct.

References

Pleuroceridae
Extinct gastropods
Gastropods described in 1845
Taxonomy articles created by Polbot